Leonard Dennis (born 13 November 1964) is a Jamaican former international footballer who played semi-professionally in England as a striker.

Career

Club career
Dennis played club football for Sutton United (where he started in the famous FA Cup win over Coventry City), Welling United, Woking and Billericay Town. He also scored 6 goals in 34 appearances for Kingstonian.

International career
Dennis made one international appearance for Jamaica in 1988, in a World Cup qualifier against the United States.

After football
After retiring as a player, Dennis became a teacher at a number of different schools.

References
General

Specific

1964 births
Living people
Jamaican footballers
Jamaica international footballers
Sutton United F.C. players
Welling United F.C. players
Woking F.C. players
Kingstonian F.C. players
Billericay Town F.C. players
Association football forwards
English footballers
Footballers from Lewisham
Black British sportspeople